Chen Qiaolin (born September 2, 1996) is a Chinese road and track cyclist, who most recently rode for UCI Women's Continental Team . Competing in the team pursuit she won a gold medal at the 2017 Asian Championships and a silver at the 2018 Asian Games.

References

External links

Chinese female cyclists
1996 births
Living people
Cyclists at the 2018 Asian Games
Asian Games silver medalists for China
Medalists at the 2018 Asian Games
Asian Games medalists in cycling
21st-century Chinese women